Jonathan Peter Culshaw (born 2 June 1968) is an English actor, comedian and impressionist. He is best known for his work on the radio comedy Dead Ringers since 2000.

Culshaw has voiced a number of characters for ITV shows including 2DTV (2001), Spitting Image (1994–96) and Newzoids (2015–2016), as well as appearing in The Impressions Show alongside Debra Stephenson from 2009 until 2011.

Early life and career
Culshaw was born on 2 June 1968 in Ormskirk, Lancashire, and educated at St Bede's RC High School and St John Rigby College, Wigan.

Culshaw's radio career began in hospital radio in Ormskirk. His first job was at Red Rose Radio (now Rock FM) in Preston in 1987, where, even then, he used to occasionally read the weather in the voice of Frank Bruno. He did voice-over work, then was catapulted to prominence with Spitting Image, where he voiced around forty characters, including John Major in the 1990s, who was then the Prime Minister.

Culshaw is also a former student of Canterbury Christ Church University.

For around four years in the late 1980s, Culshaw was a DJ on commercial radio station Viking FM, based in Hull, and also had a breakfast show on Pennine Radio (now the Pulse of West Yorkshire) and Radio Wave in Blackpool. It was a receptionist at Viking FM who persuaded Culshaw that he should go onstage with his impressions and make it his living. Culshaw later appeared on BBC Radio 2's It's Been a Bad Week, appeared as a guest on the BBC Two Star Trek Night quiz in August 1996, and was also a regular guest on the Chris Moyles afternoon show on BBC Radio 1 from 1998 to 2002, where he would phone up commercial organisations such as a Kwik-Fit garage in the voice of Patrick Moore or Obi-Wan Kenobi politely requesting whether they could service his X-wing fighter and how much time it would take.

Career

Radio
Culshaw rose to fame in January 1998 while working with Steve Penk on Capital Radio, by impersonating William Hague and succeeding in contacting Number 10 Downing Street. He was put through to Tony Blair who, despite instantly discovering the ruse, had a lengthy conversation with him until a member of Blair's staff ended the call.

Culshaw was one of the stars of the BBC Radio 4 comedy series Dead Ringers, which ran from 2000 to 2007 as well as the BBC Two television series of the same name, from 2002 until 2007. The radio series of Dead Ringers made a return to BBC Radio 4 in 2014.

In 2018, Culshaw gave a rare dramatic performance as David Bowie in the BBC radio play The Final Take: Bowie in the Studio, an imagined account of Bowie as he works on his final album and looks back over his life.

Television
Between 2001 and 2002, Culshaw hosted a programme on ITV called Alter Ego, where he interviewed male celebrities in their own style of speaking, a form of simultaneous translation. Culshaw also appeared on 2DTV, a cartoon version of Dead Ringers. In early 2004, using the same production team, he had his own programme, The Impressionable Jon Culshaw commissioned for ITV.

In 2005, Culshaw was a celebrity contestant on Comic Relief Does Fame Academy and was the fourth person to become eliminated. In the same year, he also appeared in the BBC General Election coverage, in the guises of Tony Blair and George W. Bush. In January 2006, Culshaw presented one series of the BBC programme Jon Culshaw's Commercial Breakdown. In November 2007 and December 2008, Culshaw, a keen amateur astronomer, appeared on The Sky at Night impersonating a young Sir Patrick Moore. In March 2011, he appeared again on the 700th episode of The Sky at Night, reading viewer questions to the panel of experts. Culshaw later appeared two months later reporting on the Northern Lights.

In January 2008, he appeared on Big Brother: Celebrity Hijack, as part of a pub-quiz team with Chris Moyles. In May 2008, Culshaw appeared in the BBC documentary series Comedy Map of Britain.

Since 2009, Culshaw has starred in the BBC One comedy sketch show The Impressions Show alongside Debra Stephenson.

On 13 March 2010, Jon was a guest judge on the BBC One charity programme Let's Dance for Comic Relief. In 2013, he appeared as a contestant on the show, where he performed a routine to "Praise You" by Fatboy Slim. However, he was eliminated by the public vote.

In 2010, Culshaw appeared in the television series, Missing as Des Martin. In November 2013, Culshaw appeared in the one-off 50th anniversary comedy homage The Five(ish) Doctors Reboot.

Since 2015, he has voiced a number of characters alongside Debra Stephenson for the ITV sketch show Newzoids. A second series aired in 2016.

In 2017, Jon was one of the minor hosts of the Channel 5 documentary series Secrets of the National Trust. In February 2021, Culshaw appeared on Celebrity Mastermind, doing "Doctor Who  - the Jon Pertwee Years" for his specialist subject.

Culshaw narrates the Channel 4 property series 'Sun, Sea, and Selling Houses'.

Film
In film, Culshaw appeared as Tony Blair in the 2004 film Churchill: The Hollywood Years and voiced Piston Pete in the 2008 film Agent Crush.

Impressions
Some of Culshaw's most famous impressions include former British Prime Ministers Tony Blair and Boris Johnson, Obi-Wan Kenobi (in the Alec Guinness persona), Russell Crowe, Presidents George W. Bush and Donald Trump, Ozzy Osbourne, comedian Michael McIntyre, presenter Dale Winton, newsreader Brian Perkins, Sir Patrick Moore, Tom Baker and Les Dawson.

Doctor Who
Culshaw has appeared in numerous Doctor Who related productions in various roles. This first came to fruition with his impersonation of Tom Baker's Fourth Doctor for both the TV and radio versions of Dead Ringers.

He has also appeared in the webcast "Death Comes to Time" and audio drama The Kingmaker. In the latter, he got to perform his Tom Baker impression "for real" (voicing tape recordings of the fourth Doctor), although his nominal part was that of Earl Rivers. In 2019, he appeared in a trilogy of Doctor Who audio dramas alongside Fifth Doctor Peter Davison, playing the shape-shifting android Kamelion. He later started playing Brigadier Lethbridge Stewart alongside Tim Treloar as the Third Doctor.

Awards and honours
In 2006, Culshaw received an honorary fellowship from the University of Central Lancashire in Preston. In December 2010, he was awarded an honorary doctorate by Edge Hill University. In July 2013 he was awarded an honorary Doctor of Laws degree from the University of Leicester. In March 2019, Culshaw sat for British impressionist artist Sherree Valentine-Daines for a portrait painted to mark the opening of the Clarendon Fine Art Gallery in Hampstead, London.

Charity
Culshaw is a celebrity ambassador for the charity Trekstock.

Culshaw also supports the Starlight Children's Foundation.

Culshaw regularly presents Gold Duke of Edinburgh's Awards as part of his support for the charity.

In 2016 he participated in the Great North Run to raise funds for the Jon Egging Trust, a charity set up in memory of the Red Arrows flight lieutenant who died while flying at the Red Arrows Display at the Bournemouth Air Festival.

Filmography
Film

Television

Guest appearances

Who Wants to Be a Millionaire? (2007, 2013)
Celebrity Are You Smarter than a Ten Year Old? (2008)
Hotel Babylon (2008) 
Celebrity Mastermind (2008) 
Heston's Eighties Feast (2010) 
The Sky at Night (2011)
Stargazing Live (2012) 
Celebrity Antiques Road Trip (2012)
Britain's Secret Treasures (2012)
Pointless Celebrities (2012, 2014)
The Chase: Celebrity Special (2013)
Tipping Point: Lucky Stars (2014) 
Holiday of My Lifetime (2014) 
Bruce Forsyth's Hall of Fame (2014) 
Get Your Act Together (2015)
All Star Family Fortunes (2015) 
This Week (2015) 
Sunday Brunch (2015) 
The Paul O'Grady Show (2015)
Celebrity Money for Nothing (2017)
The Hairy Bikers Home for Christmas (2017)

References

External links
 
 Alter Ego.
 Article in The Stage
 BBC Dead Ringers.
 Honorary fellowship

Audio clips
 Prank call.
 The Time Lord contacts terrestrial organisations by telephone.
 Voice over work.
 Viking FM jingle
 Talking about his work on Dead Ringers.
 Interviewed on Radio Lancashire in July 2006
 Helping out with Budget 2005 on Radio Five Live
 Would You featuring celebrity vocals
 Talking on Danny Baker's programme.
 This is the Radio Four News with Brian Perkins.
 Are you sitting comfortably? It's time for Dead Ringers to begin.

Video clips
 Receiving his honorary degree in Preston (YouTube)

1968 births
Living people
20th-century English comedians
20th-century English male actors
21st-century English comedians
21st-century English male actors
English impressionists (entertainers)
English male comedians
English male film actors
English male television actors
English male voice actors
Male actors from Lancashire
People from Ormskirk